Henryk VI may refer to:

 Henry VI the Good (1294–1335)
 Henry VI the Older (bef. 1345 – 1393)